American Politics Research is a peer-reviewed academic journal that covers the subfield of American politics in the discipline of political science. The journal's editor-in-chief is Costas Panagopolous (Northeastern University). It was established in 1973 and is currently published by SAGE Publications.

Abstracting and indexing 
American Politics Research is abstracted and indexed in Scopus and the Social Sciences Citation Index. According to the Journal Citation Reports, the journal has a 2017 impact factor of 1.089, ranking it 96 out of 169 journals in the category "Political Science".

References

External links 
 

SAGE Publishing academic journals
English-language journals
Bimonthly journals
Publications established in 1973
Political science journals
Political science in the United States
1973 establishments in the United States